Junodia lameyi is a species of praying mantis found in Angola, Côte d'Ivoire, Ghana, Guinea, Cameroon and the Congo River region.

See also
List of mantis genera and species

References

Junodia
Insects of Cameroon
Insects of Angola
Insects of West Africa
Mantodea of Africa
Insects described in 1942